"Brian Goes Back to College" is the 15th episode of the fourth season of the American animated television series Family Guy. It originally aired on the Fox network in the United States on November 13, 2005. Guest stars on the show were Ralph Garman, Mark Hentemann and Phil LaMarr. The episode was described by show creator Seth MacFarlane to be "a real treat for The A-Team fans". The episode contained several connections with The New Yorker; in response, they wrote a friendly article about the episode. The plot consists of Peter, Joe, Cleveland and Quagmire winning a costume contest dressed as characters from The A-Team, and deciding to improve their community by continuing to act like the characters of the show. Brian is hired by The New Yorker, but is later dismissed as he did not complete college, so he returns to finish his education.

Plot 
Peter, Joe, Cleveland, and Quagmire win a costume contest as characters from The A-Team (because they had an actual black guy as B. A. Baracus and the other team had a Jewish man for the same role). The four men find Brian, who is writing a report for the local newspaper. When Peter and his friends win the costume contest, Brian writes a report about it, and is later telephoned by a member of The New Yorker, who tell him they would like him to work for their magazine. Brian is initially given a warm welcome by the staff, but he is immediately fired after he informs them he never graduated from college. Meanwhile, disappointed at no longer being able to be The A-Team, Peter decides to become an unofficial A-Team alongside Joe, Cleveland, and Quagmire, and decide to help their local community. Peter designs a replica of the van used by The A-Team.

After encouragement from Lois, Brian decides to return to Brown University in order to complete his education so he can go back to The New Yorker. Stewie, unknowing to Brian, returns to college with him. Brian's new teacher (the Stephen Hawking-esque man from "Ready, Willing, and Disabled")  takes an instant disliking to him, but his opinion of Brian quickly changes after he cheats on a test by plagiarizing Stewie's work with his permission (due to Stewie's knowledge of technology and physics) and gets a high mark. Brian goes to tell his teacher that he cheated, but is interrupted, as the teacher tells him Brian has inspired him, and he was so depressed that he was planning to commit suicide. Meanwhile, Peter becomes very satisfied with his A-Team's actions, but the team fails a mission to save a local park from demolition by becoming "side-tracked by idle conversation" with the builders. The guilty A-Team disbands afterwards. Brian eventually cracks under the pressure of a final test and knowing he will only pass if he cheats, he decides to return home with Stewie. A shocked Lois attempts to encourage him to go back and finish the test, and eventually chases him away with a vacuum cleaner called "Mr. Hoover".

Brian ends up exercising for hours with the help of Stewie, Brian starts to exercise and lift on the top of a mountain, but realizes his test is only a few hours away. He becomes stressed at being late for his exam, so Lois persuades Peter to revive The A-Team one last time and drive Brian to his test, which is successful, and Brian arrives on time. He fails his test, but remains proud of himself for not cheating, much to the dismay of the family, who tells him that he probably should have cheated. Brian tries to reassure them that he finished what he started and labels his pride of that 'something', but the Griffins continue to berate him.

Production 

Several people who were involved in the production of the original A-Team worked with show producers for this episode. Ron Jones wrote the music during the scene where Peter and his friends help the man in the bar; Jones had also written music for the actual The A-Team series in the 1980s. This episode marks the third appearance of Brian's wheelchair-using teacher; he originally appears in  "Ready, Willing, and Disabled" and "Brian the Bachelor" when competing in the Special Olympics during the former episode and attempting to become a candidate for The Bachelorette in the latter episode. The professor's and his wife's voices were not played by a real person; they were made from a generic computer system in the studio. A deleted scene was animated which showed the professor informing Brian that he once had a student who was identical to him, but instead took human form and had a mustache. David Goodman commented this as being a pretty strange gag. Several viewers contacted Greg Colton, a Family Guy director, asking him if Roger Williams Park (a real public park in Rhode Island) was due to be demolished. He commented that one couple were extremely worried, because they were due to have their wedding there. The title of the episode was originally meant to be "Brian Goes Back to College and Stewie Goes With Him for Obvious Comedic Reasons", but it was deemed too long.

Cultural references 
Peter and his friends parody the 1980s American drama series The A-Team. When the introduction sequence of The A-Team was made for the episode, it took the writers and producers several attempts to animate it correctly. The background images used were real images used from The A-Team'''s intro sequence. When Brian is shown to be exercising heavily at a ski resort under the supervision of Stewie, and then climbs the mountain and shouts from the top, the montage is a reference to Rocky IV. The 1980s television convention that the gang attends features references to Too Close for Comfort ("Cosmic Cow Autographs") and The Cosby Show ("Bill Cosby aerobics"). At the American football game, the teams playing are "Brown" and the "Board of Education", referencing the Brown v. Board of Education court case in 1954 which led to desegregation in the US school system.

 Reception The New Yorker wrote a friendly response article to this episode, as they were featured in it. They appeared to take no offense at the episode, and did not retaliate. Ryan J. Budke of TV Squad praised The A Team'' parody in the episode, stating that the "30 second recreation of the A-Team opening had me about as excited as anything else on TV".

References

External links 
 

Family Guy (season 4) episodes
2005 American television episodes